Kultsu FC is a football club from Joutseno, Lappeenranta, Finland. The club was formed in 1941. Kultsu FC play their home matches at Joutsenon keskuskenttä. The team currently plays in the Kolmonen, fourth tier in Finland.

Current squad

References 
Official website
Club profile on Soccerway

Football clubs in Finland
Association football clubs established in 1941
Lappeenranta